Parkano is a town and municipality in Finland.

The municipality is unilingually Finnish.

Transport
The private coach company OnniBus route Helsinki—Seinäjoki—Vaasa has a stop at Parkano.

Notable people
The most famous person to live in Parkano is probably "the baron of Parkano", Gustav Wrede af Elimä. 
 Signe Brander (1869–1942)
 Yrjö Pulkkinen (1875–1945)
 Walto Tuomioja (1888–1931)
 Kari Asikainen (born 1939)
 Kai Suikkanen (born 1959)
 Saija Varjus (born 1965)
 Johanna Lehtinen (born 1979)
 Toni Rajala (born 1991)

References

External links 

Town of Parkano – Official website
Photos Parkano Church

Cities and towns in Finland
Municipalities of Pirkanmaa
Populated places established in 1867